The Ligue 2 season 2005–06, organised by the LFP was won by Valenciennes FC and saw the promotions of Valenciennes FC, CS Sedan Ardennes and FC Lorient, whereas AC Ajaccio, RC Strasbourg and FC Metz were relegated from Ligue 1.

20 participating teams

 Amiens
 Bastia
 Brest
 Caen
 Châteauroux
 Clermont
 Créteil
 Dijon
 Grenoble
 Gueugnon
 Guingamp
 Istres
 Laval
 Le Havre
 Lorient
 Montpellier
 Reims
 Sedan
 Sète
 Valenciennes

League table

Results

Top goalscorers

External links
RSSSF archives of results
Official attendance on LFP site

Ligue 2 seasons
French
2005–06 in French football